The Amazing Race 31 (also promoted as The Amazing Race: Reality Showdown) is the thirty-first season of the American reality television show The Amazing Race. It featured eleven teams of two, each consisting of former contestants from CBS's flagship reality shows, Big Brother, Survivor, and The Amazing Race, competing in a race around the world. 

The season premiered on CBS on April 17, 2019, and the season finale aired on June 26, 2019.

All three of the final teams consisted of returning players from previous seasons of The Amazing Race. Life partners Colin Guinn and Christie Woods, who had competed on The Amazing Race 5, were the winners of this season. Best friends Tyler Oakley and Korey Kuhl, who had competed on The Amazing Race 28, finished in second place; and cousins Leo Temory and Jamal Zadran, who had competed on The Amazing Race 23 and The Amazing Race 24, finished in third.

Production

Development and filming

On June 10, 2018, Phil Keoghan announced on the show's social media accounts that the season had begun filming and that the teams would be composed of contestants from CBS's reality competition programs. On July 3, filming concluded in Detroit, which featured a performance of The White Stripes' single "Seven Nation Army" that was originally planned to be set in Belle Isle Park. However, the permit was denied as the Michigan Department of Natural Resources had not been informed about the large gathering of musicians needed for filming. 

In the lead-in to the 2018-19 television programming season, CBS had scheduled The Amazing Race 31 to begin airing on May 22, 2019. However, in early April 2019, CBS opted to bring the premiere forward to April 17, 2019, slotting the show in Wednesdays after Survivor and replacing the low-rated Million Dollar Mile.

The Amazing Race 31 traveled over 25,000 miles across four continents and ten countries, including first-time visits to Uganda and Laos.

The Head-to-Head returned this season after it was introduced in the previous season. This season is also the first to utilize the U-Turn Vote, which has been previously utilized by the Israeli, Chinese, Australian, and Filipino versions of The Amazing Race.

Casting
On May 4, 2018, a TMZ article reported that former Big Brother HouseGuests had been asked to compete on the upcoming season of The Amazing Race. Later that day, Andy Dehnart posted that former Amazing Race contestants had also been contacted for the same season. Martin Holmes from Inside Survivor then posted that former Survivor contestants were also in the mix.

Eric Sanchez and Jeremy Ryan from season 9 were contacted and agreed to participate, but were ultimately cut when the show decided to include Big Brother and Survivor teams.
Justin and Diana Scheman (née Bishop) from season 27 were originally selected, but declined the invitation due to Diana being pregnant.
Keith and Wes Nale from Survivor: San Juan del Sur were contacted, but ultimately didn't make the final cast.
Kym Perfetto and Alli Forsythe from season 25 were originally considered, but ultimately cut.
The Linz family from season 8 were originally considered, but ultimately cut.
Mark Jansen and Elena Davies from Big Brother 19 were contacted to compete and agreed to participate, but were cut a few days before filming.
Rob Cesternino from Survivor: The Amazon and Survivor: All-Stars and Stephen Fishbach from Survivor: Tocantins and Survivor: Cambodia were contacted and expressed interest, but declined due to Fishbach's wedding overlapping with filming.
Will Kirby and Mike "Boogie" Malin, the winners of Big Brother 2 and Big Brother: All-Stars, respectively, were asked to compete, but Kirby declined.

Cast

This season involved eleven teams, three of whom previously competed on Big Brother, three of whom previously competed on Survivor, and five of whom previously competed on The Amazing Race.

From Big Brother:
 Janelle Pierzina competed on Big Brother 6, Big Brother 7, and Big Brother 14. 
 Britney Haynes competed on Big Brother 12 and Big Brother 14.
 Nicole Franzel competed on Big Brother 16 and Big Brother 18. 
 Victor Arroyo competed on Big Brother 18.
 Rachel Reilly competed on Big Brother 12 and Big Brother 13. (Rachel also competed on The Amazing Race 20 and The Amazing Race 24.)
 Elissa Slater competed on Big Brother 15.
From Survivor:
 Chris Hammons and Bret LaBelle competed on Survivor: Millennials vs. Gen X.
 Corinne Kaplan competed on Survivor: Gabon and Survivor: Caramoan. 
 Eliza Orlins competed on Survivor: Vanuatu and Survivor: Micronesia.
 Rupert Boneham competed on Survivor: Pearl Islands, Survivor: All-Stars, Survivor: Heroes vs. Villains, and Survivor: Blood vs. Water. 
 Laura Boneham competed on Survivor: Blood vs. Water.
From The Amazing Race:
 Art Velez and JJ Carrell competed on The Amazing Race 20.
 Colin Guinn and Christie Woods competed on The Amazing Race 5.
 Leo Temory and Jamal Zadran competed on The Amazing Race 23 and The Amazing Race 24.
 Becca Droz and Floyd Pierce competed on The Amazing Race 29.
 Tyler Oakley and Korey Kuhl competed on The Amazing Race 28.
Future appearances
Janelle Pierzina and Nicole Franzel returned to Big Brother to compete on the show's second All-Stars season.  On September 3, 2020, Bret LaBelle appeared on Revenge Prank. In 2022, Leo Temory competed on The Challenge: USA. Pierzina and Rachel Reilly competed on the USA Network reality competition series, Snake in the Grass. In 2023, Reilly also competed on the Peacock reality TV series The Traitors.

Results
The following teams are listed with their placements in each leg. Placements are listed in finishing order. 
A  placement with a dagger indicates that the team was eliminated. 
An  placement with a double-dagger indicates that the team was the last to arrive at a pit stop in a non-elimination leg, and had to perform a Speed Bump task in the following leg.
A  indicates that the team used the U-Turn and a  indicates the team on the receiving end of the U-Turn.

Notes

Race summary

Leg 1 (United States → Japan)

Episode 1: "You're in Our Race Now" (April 17, 2019)
Prize: A seven-day cruise for two to French Polynesia (awarded to Leo & Jamal)
Eliminated: Art & JJ
Locations
Hermosa Beach, California (Hermosa Beach Pier) (Starting Line)
Hermosa Beach (Hermosa City Beach)
 Los Angeles → Tokyo, Japan
 Tokyo (Narita International Airport → Shibuya) 
Tokyo (Shibuya – ACB Lock & Security  Tokyo Tokyo Restaurant)
Tokyo (Shibuya – EDGEof Shibuya Building) 
Tokyo (Minato – Onarimon Station)
Tokyo (Minato – Shiba Koen) 
Tokyo (Minato – Atago Jinja) 
Episode summary
Teams set off from the Hermosa Beach Pier and ran down to a giant octopus-shaped sand sculpture on an adjacent beach, where they dug for their first clue, which revealed their first destination: Tokyo, Japan. Once in Tokyo, teams traveled by charter bus to Shibuya. Once there, teams were instructed to travel on foot to one of two locations, ACB Lock & Security or Tokyo Tokyo Restaurant, where they received their next clue. Each location only had a limited number of clues.
 In this season's first Roadblock, one team member had to pick one of several getas and bite the sandal until they found one of twelve made of chocolate. Both team members then had to eat the chocolate geta in order to receive their next clue.
After completing the first Roadblock, teams had to travel by taxi to Onarimon Station and then make their way to the nearby Shiba Koen in order to find their next clue.
 In this leg's second Roadblock, the team member who did not perform the previous Roadblock had to don a blue unitard and climb to the summit of a  slippery slope that resembled Mount Fuji in order to retrieve their next clue.
Teams had to check in at the pit stop: the Atago Jinja in Tokyo.

Leg 2 (Japan → Laos)

Episode 2: "Knock the Newbie Out of Us" (April 24, 2019)
Prize:  each (awarded to Leo & Jamal)
Eliminated: Rupert & Laura
Locations
Tokyo (Minato – Atago Jinja) 
 Tokyo → Luang Prabang, Laos
Luang Prabang (Villa Santi)
Luang Prabang (Wat Sensoukharam)
Luang Prabang (Big Tree by the Mekong River) 
Luang Prabang (École Maternelle Louang Prabang  BBQ Alley) 
Ban Xieng Lom (Elephant Village) 
 Luang Prabang (Wat Xieng Thong) → Ban Xiengkeo (Prince Phetsarath's Palace) 
Episode summary
At the beginning of this leg, teams were instructed to fly to Luang Prabang, Laos. Once there, teams had to travel by tuk-tuk to Villa Santi and wait for their next clue to arrive by courier before sunrise. The clue instructed them to take part in the local morning alms by giving servings of sticky rice to a procession of Buddhist monks at Wat Sensoukharam. Before the monks' arrival, each team member had to don a pha biang and pick up basket of rice. After the monks passed, teams received their next clue, which directed them to a tree by the Mekong River.
 This season's first Detour was a choice between ABC or BBQ. In ABC, teams had to find the École Maternelle Louang Prabang and learn the Lao alphabet from a teacher. Once they'd learned the alphabet, teams had to pass an oral exam in order to receive their next clue. In BBQ, teams had to find BBQ Alley and purchase three ducks and eight tilapia. They then had to prepare eleven Lao barbecue skewers exactly like the skewers prepared during an ongoing demonstration in order to receive their next clue.
 In this leg's Roadblock, one team member had to learn a series of Lao commands and then direct an elephant across the Nam Khan River. Once across, they had to search for two men playing Hmong music on qeejs. Once found, team members received their next clue and had to direct their elephant back to the Elephant Village in order to reunite with their partner.
After completing the Roadblock, teams had to travel by tuk-tuk to Wat Xieng Thong, where they boarded a long-tail boat and traveled to the pit stop.
Additional notes
 This leg featured a Double U-Turn. Rachel & Elissa chose to use the U-Turn on Becca & Floyd, while Becca & Floyd chose to use the U-Turn on Tyler & Korey.

Leg 3 (Laos → Vietnam)

Episode 3: "Here Fishy, Fishy, Fishy" (May 1, 2019)
Prize: A trip for two to Bimini, Bahamas (awarded to Becca & Floyd)
Locations
Ban Xiengkeo (Prince Phetsarath's Palace) 
 Luang Prabang → Ho Chi Minh City, Vietnam
Ho Chi Minh City (House of Vietnamese Medicine)
Ho Chi Minh City (Thanh Đa Restaurant  The CREATV Company Film Studio) 
Ho Chi Minh City (Kingdom Karaoke) 
Ho Chi Minh City (Hồ Thị Kỷ Flower Market) 
Episode summary
At the beginning of this leg, teams were instructed to fly to Ho Chi Minh City, Vietnam. Once there, teams had to find a doctor at the House of Vietnamese Medicine, who gave them a packet of herbal remedies, which contained their next clue.
 This leg's Detour was a choice between Reel It In or Light It Up. In Reel It In, teams had to travel to Thanh Đa Restaurant and catch eight prawns from the pool inside the restaurant using fishing poles in order to receive their next clue. In Light It Up, teams had to travel to The CREATV Company film studio and learn a dance. When ready, they donned a glowsuit covered with electroluminescent wire and had to dance in sync alongside local dancers and Asia's Got Talent contestants 218 Dance Crew in order to receive their next clue.
 In this leg's Roadblock, one team member had to learn the Vietnamese lyrics of Trúc Nhân's song "Thật Bất Ngờ" and then perform it karaoke-style in front of an audience. If they sang the lyrics correctly, they received their next clue.
Teams had to check in at the pit stop: the Hồ Thị Kỷ Flower Market in Ho Chi Minh City.
Additional notes
This was a non-elimination leg.

Leg 4 (Vietnam)

Episode 4: "I Took Out a Polar Bear" (May 8, 2019)
Prize: A trip for two to Punta Cana, Dominican Republic (awarded to Colin & Christie)
Eliminated: Corinne & Eliza
Locations
Ho Chi Minh City (Hồ Thị Kỷ Flower Market) 
Ho Chi Minh City (SnowTown Saigon) 
Ho Chi Minh City (College Transportation Central) 
Ho Chi Minh City (Bình Quới Village) 
 Ho Chi Minh City (Tầm Vu Park)  
Episode summary
At the beginning of this leg, teams had to travel to SnowTown Saigon, where they had to ride a sled down an indoor slope to a person dressed as a polar bear, who gave them their next clue.
 For their Speed Bump, Chris & Bret had to fill a cooler with snowballs in simulated snowstorm conditions and then deliver the cooler to College Transportation Central before they could continue racing.
 In this leg's Roadblock, one team member had to pass a Vietnamese driving test by driving a scooter through a figure-eight and over a series of speed bumps in order to receive their next clue.
 This leg's Detour was a choice between Irritation or Irrigation. In Irritation, teams had to paddle a basket boat  while avoiding fishermen on boats and moving their boat over bridges in order to pick up a basket of five fish. They then had to paddle back to the start and exchange the fish and the basket for their next clue. In Irrigation, teams had to assemble a bamboo water wheel and then use the water wheel to fill a jar with water in order to receive their next clue.
After completing the Detour, teams had to travel by bus and then on foot to the pit stop: Tầm Vu Park, adjacent to the Thanh Đa Canal.
Additional notes
 At Tầm Vu Park, teams encountered a Head-to-Head, which was unaired. Two teams had to compete against each other in a badminton match. The team that won the Head-to-Head could check in at the nearby pit stop, while the team that lost had to wait for the next team. The team that lost the final Head-to-Head was eliminated.

Leg 5 (Vietnam → United Arab Emirates)

Episode 5: "I'm a Bird, I'm a Plane, I'm on The Amazing Race" (May 22, 2019)
Prize:  each (awarded to Becca & Floyd)
Locations
Ho Chi Minh City (Tầm Vu Park) 
 Ho Chi Minh City → Dubai, United Arab Emirates
Al Faqa (Al Faqa Desert)
Dubai (Dubai Frame)
Dubai (Burj Khalifa – Mission 828  Dubai Garden Glow – Dinosaur Park) 
Dubai (Soho Garden) 
Dubai (Amwaj Tower 4)
Dubai (Dubai Marina) 
Episode summary
At the beginning of this leg, teams were instructed to fly to Dubai in the United Arab Emirates. Once in Dubai, teams had to travel to a "supercar tailgate party". After sampling tea and dates, teams found their next clue inside a supercar, which directed them to the Dubai Frame, where they found their next clue.
 This leg's Detour was a choice between Fall or Find. In Fall, teams had to travel to the Burj Khalifa and choose a jumpmaster, who took them up the building. There, teams had to don a virtual reality headset and use the controls to find a signal interceptor, climb to the top of a simulated spire, intercept a satellite, and parachute to the base of the building. After the jump, both team members had to correctly answer a series of test questions in order to receive their next clue. If they answered any questions incorrectly, they had to attempt the task again. In Find, teams had to travel to Dubai Garden Glow and don Tyrannosaurus rex costumes. They then had to search Dinosaur Park for five glowing colored dinosaur eggs and place them in a nest in order to receive their next clue.
 In this leg's Roadblock, one team member had to enter a silent rave and find a party-goer dancing to the same music as the DJ (a dance remix of The Amazing Race theme), using only their sight, in order to receive their next clue.
At Amwaj Tower 4, teams had to go to the top of the building and ride the world's longest urban zip-line to the pit stop at the Dubai Marina.
Additional notes
This was a non-elimination leg.

Leg 6 (United Arab Emirates → Uganda)

Episode 6: "Who Wants a Rolex?" (May 22, 2019)
Prize: A trip for two to Singapore (awarded to Tyler & Korey)
Eliminated: Janelle & Britney
Locations
Dubai (Dubai Marina) 
 Dubai → Kampala, Uganda
Kampala (Uganda National Mosque)
Kampala (Owino Market – Soweto Restaurant)  
Kampala (Lake Victoria – Ggaba Landing Site) 
Kampala (Jahazi Pier)  
Episode summary
At the beginning of this leg, teams were instructed to fly to Kampala, Uganda. Once there, teams had to make their way to the Uganda National Mosque and don customary clothing. Teams had to climb to the top of the mosque's minaret, counting the steps along the way. If they had the correct number, they received their next clue.
 In this leg's Roadblock, one team member had to find a vendor, who gave them a shopping list. They then had to purchase the ingredients on the list and use their ingredients to properly prepare a rolex in order to receive their next clue.
 For their Speed Bump, Rachel & Elissa had to hand-wash clothes and then hang them to dry before they could continue racing.
At the Ggaba Landing Site along Lake Victoria, teams had to find the village boat builders in order to receive their next clue.
 This leg's Detour was a choice between Salty Roll or Move the Pole. In Salty Roll, teams had to bring a wheelbarrow of Nile perch to a workstation. They then had to properly salt and roll the fish skin and had to wash, gut, and salt the meat in order to receive their next clue. In Move the Pole, teams had to load firewood from a canoe onto a bicycle and deliver the wood to a market. There, teams had to stack the wood to match a sample pile in order to receive their next clue.
 In this season's only aired Head-to-Head, one member from each competing team had to solve a puzzle similar to the Tower of Hanoi that consisted of four stacks of Ngoma drums. Team members had to move one drum at a time until each stack consisted of drums of the same color and grab an ox tail in order to win the Head-to-Head. The team that won the Head-to-Head could check in at the nearby pit stop, while the team that lost had to wait for the next team. The team that lost the final Head-to-Head was eliminated.

Leg 7 (Uganda → Switzerland)

Episode 7: "Living Fearlessly" (May 29, 2019)
Prize: A spa day during the pit stop (awarded to Tyler & Korey)
Locations
Kampala (Jahazi Pier) 
 Kampala → Zürich, Switzerland
 Zürich → Grindelwald
Grindelwald (Gletscherschlucht Glacier Gorge) 
 Grindelwald (Gletscherschlucht Glacier Gorge) → Guttannen (Grimsel Pass)
Guttannen (Gelmerbahn & Gelmersee  Grimsel Canyon) 
Meiringen (Michaelskirche ) 
Episode summary
At the beginning of this leg, teams were instructed to fly to Zürich, Switzerland, and then travel by train to Grindelwald. Once there, teams had to make their way to the Gletscherschlucht Glacier Gorge.
 In this leg's Roadblock, one team member was harnessed to a canyon swing, and then performed a  free-fall into the Gletscherschlucht. After the swing, they had to search the gorge for their next clue.
After completing the Roadblock, teams had to travel by helicopter to the Grimsel Pass, where they found their next clue.
 This leg's Detour was a choice between Water Power or Water Down. In Water Power, teams had to ride the Gelmerbahn. During the ride, teams had to study eight signs that identified reservoirs and the amount of water that each held. When their ride ended, teams had to match the eight reservoirs to their water capacities on a technical map in order to receive their next clue. If their map was incorrect, they had to ride the Gelmerbahn again. In Water Down, teams had to go canyoneering in the Grimsel Canyon. They had to rappel  down a canyon, jump from a ledge into a glacial river, and then jump to grab their next clue hanging from a rope. After retrieving their clue, team members had to ride a zip-line and then drop down into a river before hiking out of the canyon.
Teams had to check in at the pit stop: Michaelskirche in Meiringen.
Additional notes
This was a non-elimination leg.

Leg 8 (Switzerland)

Episode 8: "You're the Apple in My Eye" (June 5, 2019)
Prize: A seven-night river cruise for two to Vietnam & Cambodia (awarded to Tyler & Korey)
Eliminated: Rachel & Elissa
Locations
Meiringen (Michaelskirche ) 
Hofstetten bei Brienz (Ballenberg Community Hall)  
Hofstetten bei Brienz (Ballenberg Open Air Museum) 
Schwanden bei Brienz (Oberschwanden) 
 Brienz (Grand Hotel Giessbach ) 
Episode summary
 At beginning of this leg, teams traveled to the Ballenberg Community Hall, where Phil Keoghan informed them that they would be voting for two teams to be U-Turned in this leg. The vote was an open vote, and the voting order was determined by a random draw. The team's votes, as well as the voting order, are as follows:
{| class="wikitable unsortable" style="text-align:center;"
! scope="col" |Team
! scope="col" |Vote
|-
! scope="row" | Rachel & Elissa
| bgcolor=tan | Colin & Christie
|-
! scope="row" | Nicole & Victor
| Leo & Jamal
|-
! scope="row" | Colin & Christie
| bgcolor=tan | Rachel & Elissa
|-
! scope="row" | Leo & Jamal
| bgcolor=tan | Colin & Christie
|-
! scope="row" | Becca & Floyd
| bgcolor=tan | Colin & Christie
|-
! scope="row" | Tyler & Korey
| Nicole & Victor
|-
! scope="row" | Chris & Bret
| bgcolor=tan | Rachel & Elissa
|}
 For their Speed Bump, Nicole & Victor had to fold the 26 Swiss canton flags in the Ballenberg Community Hall and place them in a basket before they could continue racing.
 This leg's Detour was a choice between Haymaking or Cow Dressing. In Haymaking, one team member had to use a scythe to cut a lane of grass while their partner raked it. They then had to properly stack the grass so that it could dry into hay in order to receive their next clue. In Cow Dressing, teams had to use provided materials to re-create a floral headdress and place it on a cow's head. They then had to lead the cow to a festival in order to receive their next clue.
 In this leg's Roadblock, one team member had to use a crossbow to shoot an apple off a scarecrow's head in order to receive their next clue. If team members struck the scarecrow, they had to reassemble it before taking another shot.
After completing the Roadblock, teams had to drive to Lake Brienz. There, they had to pilot a motorboat and across the lake to a marked pier. After disembarking, they could travel either by foot or by funicular to the pit stop: the Grand Hotel Giessbach.
Additional notes
The Detour options on the teams' clues were listed as Haymaking and Cow Dressing; however, the graphics on the show listed the Detour options as Make Hay and Cow Festival.

Leg 9 (Switzerland → Croatia)

Episode 9: "Let's Split!" (June 12, 2019)
Prize: A trip for two to Riviera Maya, Mexico (awarded to Tyler & Korey)
Eliminated: Chris & Bret
Locations
Meiringen (Michaelskirche ) 
 Meiringen → Zürich
 Zürich → Split, Croatia
Split (Bačvice Beach  – Caffe Bar Žbirac)
Split (Marjan Cave Church)
Split (Kašjuni Beach) 
Split (Diocletian's Palace) 
 Split (Matejuška Pier) 
Episode summary
At the beginning of this leg, teams were instructed to travel by train to Zürich and then fly to Split, Croatia. Once there, teams had to travel to Bačvice Beach, where each team member had to carry three glasses of punch from the Caffe Bar Žbirac to a group of sunbathers, who gave the teams a Travelocity Roaming Gnome that they had to keep with them for the remainder of the leg. After returning the trays to the bartender, teams received their next clue.
At the Marjan Cave Church, teams had to use a pulley system to deliver a loaf of bread up to a monk, who sent down their next clue in return.
 This leg's Detour was a choice between Poetry in Motion or Washed in from the Ocean. In Poetry in Motion, teams had to memorize a poem while riding a large flying tube being towed by a speedboat. After returning to shore, teams had to correctly recite the poem in order to receive their next clue. If there were unable to recite the poem correctly, they had to ride the tube again. In Washed in from the Ocean, teams had to go snorkeling and use a metal detector to search the Adriatic Sea for a goblet and five coins, which they could exchange for their next clue after returning to shore. Though some teams did initially try searching for the goblet and coins, they all became frustrated and ended up switching to the poetry task instead.
 In this leg's Roadblock, one team member had to enter a Roman Senator's room and watch a troop of eighteen soldiers march in formation. After the soldiers covered themselves with shields, team members had to correctly identify the five soldiers wearing red ribbons around their helmets in order to receive their next clue.
After completing the Roadblock, teams had to board a dinghy and row themselves to the pit stop at Matejuška Pier.
Additional notes
Bačvice Beach was misidentified on the show's graphics as Kašjuni Beach, as Leo & Jamal instructed their taxi driver to take them to the Caffe Žbirac on Bačvice Beach, and Becca also instructed her taxi driver to take them to Bačvice Beach.

Leg 10 (Croatia → Netherlands)

Episode 10: "Chugga Chugga Choo Choo!" (June 19, 2019)
Prize:  each (awarded to Colin & Christie)
Eliminated: Becca & Floyd
Locations
Split (Matejuška Pier) 
 Split → Amsterdam, Netherlands
 Amsterdam → Kampen
 Kampen (Kampen Railway Station → Jachthaven)
 Kampen (Erf 34 & Nieuwe Toren  Erf 29 & Kampen Market) 
 Kampen (IJsselkade ) 
 Kampen (Kampen Railway Station)
 Giethoorn (Bovenwijde Lake Island ) 
Episode summary
At the beginning of this leg, teams were instructed to fly to Amsterdam, Netherlands, and then travel by train to Kampen. Outside the Kampen railway station, teams had to search a bicycle parking lot for a marked tandem bicycle, which they had to ride to the Jachthaven in order to find their next clue.
 This leg's Detour was a choice between High or Dry. In High, teams had to ride their tandem bicycles to a farm and load a "Kamper cow" onto a trailer behind a tractor. They then had to follow the tractor on their bicycles to the Nieuwe Toren and hoist the cow to the top of the tower within 40 seconds. If they could raise the cow within the time limit, one team member had to climb to the top of the bell tower and receive their next clue. In Dry, teams had to bike to a farm, where both team members had to pole vault across an irrigation ditch "the Dutch way". They then had to bring two cheese orbs and a dozen eggs back across the ditch and transport them to the Kampen Market intact in order to receive their next clue.
After completing the Detour, teams had to travel by bicycle to the IJsselkade, where they found their next clue. Teams then had to return their bicycles to the railway station and drive themselves to Giethoorn. There, team had to board a boat and navigate the canals of Giethoorn in order to find two marked boats and create a "boat train". Teams then had to navigate their boats to the pit stop at the island on Bovenwijde Lake.
Additional notes
 This leg featured a Double U-Turn. Leo & Jamal chose to use the U-Turn on Nicole & Victor, while Nicole & Victor chose to use the U-Turn on Becca & Floyd.

Leg 11 (Netherlands → England)

Episode 11: "This One is For One Million Dollars" (June 26, 2019)
Eliminated: Nicole & Victor
Locations
Zwolle (De Koperen Hoogte ) 
 Amsterdam → London, England
 Charlwood (Gatwick Aviation Museum) → Dover (Dover Castle) 
 Dover (Dover Castle) → London (Falcon London Heliport)
 London (Masthouse Terrace Pier → Savoy Pier)
London (Piccadilly Circus)
London (Kensington Road – Cabmen's Shelter  Hyde Park – The Serpentine) 
London (Camden Market) 
Episode summary
At the beginning of this leg, teams were instructed to fly to London, England. Once there, teams made their way to the Gatwick Aviation Museum, where they boarded a helicopter that took them over the Seven Sisters before landing near Dover Castle, where they found their next clue.
 In this leg's Roadblock, one team member had to decipher a World War II code by listening to a speech by Neville Chamberlain. Team members then had to type the decoded message on an Underwood portable typewriter and deliver it to a brigadier outside the castle's barracks. If they gave him the correct message – "The Dunkirk evacuation has begun. We will never surrender." – they received their next clue.
After completing the Roadblock, teams had to return by helicopter to London. Once there, teams had to find their next clue at Masthouse Terrace Pier, which instructed them to travel by speedboat to Savoy Pier. After disembarking, teams had to go to Piccadilly Circus and find the golden queen, who gave them their next clue.
 This season's final Detour was a choice between Know or Row. In Know, teams had to ride a taxicab and memorize the fifteen streets and seven landmarks that their driver identified during the route. When teams returned to the cabmen's shelter, they had to correctly recite their route in order to receive their next clue. In Row, teams had to row a double scull through a  course on The Serpentine in under one minute in order to receive their next clue.
At Camden Market, teams found the pit stop, where Phil Keoghan surprised them with another clue. Teams had to search nearby shops for the marked items in a display and use those items to recreate the display before they could check in at the pit stop.

Leg 12 (England → United States)

Episode 11: June 26, 2019
Winners: Colin & Christie
Second Place: Tyler & Korey
Third Place: Leo & Jamal
Locations
London (Camden Market) 
 London → Detroit, Michigan
Detroit (The Spirit of Detroit )
Detroit (Guardian Building) 
Hamtramck (Fowling Warehouse)
Detroit (Heidelberg Project) (Unaired)
Detroit (Third Man Records)
Detroit (Hart Plaza)
Detroit (Fort Wayne) 
Episode summary
At the beginning of this leg, teams were instructed to fly to Detroit, Michigan. Once in Detroit, teams found their next clue at The Spirit of Detroit.
 In this season's final Roadblock, one team member had to rappel face-first  down the Guardian Building. On the way down, they had to look for a series of numbers that they needed to unlock a bank vault in the basement of the building in order to retrieve their next clue.
At the Fowling Warehouse, teams had to play a game of fowling, which required each team member to throw a football and knock down bowling pins in order to receive their next clue.
At Third Man Records, teams had to properly press five two-tone vinyl records using Amazing Race colors in order to receive their next clue, which directed them to Hart Plaza. There, teams had to search amongst a group of Rockin' 1000 musicians to find their next clue atop a drum. Teams then had to assemble a five-piece drum kit that precisely matched an example, while the musicians played The White Stripes' single "Seven Nation Army". Once the drum kit was correctly assembled, the lead drummer gave teams their final clue, which directed them to the finish line at Fort Wayne.
Additional notes
After leaving the Fowling Warehouse, teams had to make their way to the Heidelberg Project and search through a field of Amazing Race clue boxes scattered throughout the outdoor art installation for one which contained their next clue. This task was unaired.
Legs 11 and 12 aired back-to-back as a special two-hour episode.

Reception

Critical response
The Amazing Race 31 received mostly positive reviews. Andy Dehnart of reality blurred called this season dull, writing that "TAR can still deliver beautiful cinematography and entertaining moments, like Rupert talking to an elephant, but the structure of the legs constantly undercuts any actual racing by evening up the teams." Jodi Walker of Entertainment Weekly wrote that "more reality TV competition cultures in the mix made for a little more drama than usual." The "Purple Rock Podcast" praised the cast, strong racing, and overall story saying that "this experiment paid off accordingly." In 2022, Rhenn Taguiam of Game Rant ranked this season as the second-best season.

Critics were also positive towards the growth of Colin & Christie compared to their previous appearance. Tamara Grant of CheatSheat called it "a true redemption arc because of their behavior on Season 5." Dalton Ross of Entertainment Weekly called it the "most radical reality show transformation ever."

Ratings
U.S. Nielsen ratings

Canadian ratings
Canadian broadcaster CTV also aired The Amazing Race on Wednesdays.

Canadian DVR ratings are included in Numeris's count.

References

External links

 31
2019 American television seasons
Television shows filmed in California
Television shows filmed in Japan
Television shows filmed in Laos
Television shows filmed in Vietnam
Television shows filmed in the United Arab Emirates
Television shows filmed in Uganda
Television shows filmed in Switzerland
Television shows filmed in Germany
Television shows filmed in Croatia
Television shows filmed in the Netherlands
Television shows filmed in England
Television shows filmed in Michigan